Night Ride and Other Journeys is the third anthology of short stories by Charles Beaumont, published in March 1960. The volume is out of print, but reasonably available.

Stories collected

1960 short story collections
American short story collections
Fantasy short story collections
Bantam Books books